Montescueia is a monotypic genus of South American wandering spiders containing the single species, Montescueia leitaoi. The male was described by R. U. Carcavallo & A. Martínez in 1961, but no female has been described yet. It has only been found in Argentina.

References

Ctenidae
Monotypic Araneomorphae genera
Spiders of Argentina